Abu-Bakr Yunis Jabr, (1940 – 20 October 2011) was the Libyan Secretary of the Libyan General Committee for Defence during the rule of Muammar Gaddafi. His official position was Secretary of the Libyan General Interim Committee for Defence.

Early life and education
There is disagreement about the year of Jabr's birth. According to the UN he was born in 1952 in Jalu, Libya. The German newspaper the Frankfurter Allgemeine Zeitung gives the much earlier date of 1940. Educated at the Military Academy in Benghazi, Jabr shared classes with Muammar Gaddafi.

Career
Later Gaddafi and Jabr became members of the Free Officers Movement which on 1 September 1969 removed King Idris from power in a bloodless coup and brought Gaddafi to power. Jabr was the head of the Libyan Army from the 1970s and was one of the original members of the 12 army officials of the Revolutionary Command Council led by Gaddafi. He, Gaddafi and the other surviving members of the Revolutionary Command Council sat atop the "revolutionary sector" which oversaw the government. The leaders of the revolutionary sector were not subject to election, since they owed their offices to their roles in the 1969 coup, officially described during Gaddafi's time as "the revolution."

Libyan Civil War
Jabr was reported to be under arrest and in prison for not obeying orders to kill protesters.
It was reported on 7 June 2011 that Jabr was executed by the government for refusing to carry out orders to kill protesters. On 13 June, Libyan state television showed footage of him for the first time, in what they claim was him greeting soldiers at the frontline in the oil town of Brega. On 2 August, The Washington Post wrote that on Libyan state television, Gaddafi's defense minister, Jabr, announced that members of the army who defected to join the rebels and returned to the government would be protected by a general pardon.

Death

Jabr died in the Battle of Sirte. On 20 October 2011, Al Jazeera reported that Jabr was killed in Sirte. He was in a car convoy with Gaddafi trying to flee from the Siege of Sirte. After the convoy was attacked by NATO aircraft he sought shelter from shrapnel in drain pipes with Gaddafi. NTC fighters captured him and Gaddafi. Yunis Jabr was with a group of Gaddafi loyalists, when a guard saw a group of rebels approaching them, off in the distance. The guard attempted to throw a grenade at the rebels. However, the grenade bounced off a concrete wall, and landed back in front of the loyalist group. The guard then attempted to pick the grenade up, but when he did so, it exploded. The detonation killed the guard and, according to witnesses, fatally injured Abu-Bakr Yunis Jabr. He reportedly died on his way to a hospital. Al Jazeera also aired footage of his body being driven away in an ambulance.

In January 2012, footage of Jabr's body being mutilated and spray-painted by rebels appeared on YouTube.

See also

 General People's Committee of Libya

References

Year of birth uncertain
2011 deaths
Libyan generals
Libyan military personnel killed in action
People killed in the First Libyan Civil War
Libyan Arab Socialist Union politicians
Defence ministers of Libya
Deaths by hand grenade
2011 murders in Africa
1940 births
People from Al Wahat District